Camp Colt was a military installation near Gettysburg, Pennsylvania used for Tank Corps recruit training prior to deployment in World War I.  The camp used the Gettysburg Battlefield site of the previous Great Reunion of 1913 and the preceding 1917 World War I recruit training camp for U.S. troops along the Round Top Branch.

Camp Colt was established in 1917, and opened at Gettysburg National Military Park in March, 1918 as the first post to train soldiers to use tanks during World War I. The main section of the camp was in the fields made famous 55 years before on July 3, 1863, by Pickett's Charge ordered by Confederate Commanding General Robert E. Lee. The commander of Camp Colt was Captain Dwight D. Eisenhower with it being his first command. Eisenhower would earn the rank of Major, and the Distinguished Service Medal for his efforts at Camp Colt, and he and his wife, Mamie, fell in love with the area. After retiring from the military, the Eisenhowers made their home near Gettysburg, west of Seminary Ridge.

References

GT. 

NYT. 

Closed installations of the United States Army
Gettysburg Battlefield
Military facilities in Pennsylvania
World War I sites in the United States